Goodman Mosele (born 18 November 1999) is a South African soccer player who plays as a midfielder for South African Premier Division side Orlando Pirates.

Early life and education
Born in Khuma, Mosele attended Vuyanimawethu Secondary School in Khuma before moving to Kopano High School in Lebowakgomo in 2016.

Career
After playing for Stillfontein Real Hearts, Mosele joined Baroka in 2016, aged 16, after trials with the club.

He won the PSL Young Player of the Year award for the 2019–20 season.

In July 2021, Mosele signed for Orlando Pirates.

References

Living people
1999 births
South African soccer players
Association football midfielders
Baroka F.C. players
Orlando Pirates F.C. players
South African Premier Division players
People from Dr Kenneth Kaunda District Municipality
Footballers at the 2020 Summer Olympics
Olympic soccer players of South Africa
Sportspeople from North West (South African province)